The Apoena is a Brazilian Low Altitude Long Endurance (LALE) unmanned aerial vehicle designed and built by XMobots for several kinds of sensing roles.

Design and development
The Apoena is a small monoplane built by XMobots with a composite and wood structure; it is powered by a 5.5 hp two-stroke engine mounted at the front with a two-bladed tractor propeller. First flown on 18 November 2008 the single-engined Apoena 1000 has a retractable landing gear and can carry a payload up to 10 kg. It employs a slotted-flap high lift system, something that is very rarely seen in this class of aircraft.

Specifications (Apoena 1000)

External links
XMobots Apoena Series product page

References

Unmanned aerial vehicles of Brazil
Unmanned military aircraft of Brazil
2000s Brazilian military reconnaissance aircraft
2000s Brazilian military aircraft
Apoena
V-tail aircraft